Moskovsky is a rural locality (a settlement) in Volchno-Burlinsky Selsoviet, Krutikhinsky District, Altai Krai, Russia. The population was 37 as of 2013. There are 3 streets.

Geography 
Moskovsky is located 44 km west of Krutikha (the district's administrative centre) by road. Volchno-Burlinskoye and Romanovo are the nearest rural localities.

References 

Rural localities in Krutikhinsky District